The Bird Octagonal Mule Barn, in Shelby County near Cropper, Kentucky, was built in about 1880.  It was listed on the National Register of Historic Places in 1988.

It once housed 40 mules. They were fed from a bin in the center.

It was deemed "a unique example of one type of specialized stock barns associated with agricultural diversification in the late 19th c. It is the only recorded octagonal barn and one of few mule barns to be identified in the county."

The Bird's Nest (Shelby County, Kentucky), across Cropper Road, is also listed on the National Register.  It was a large Greek Revival style house of Philomen Bird, Henry Bird's father. Philomen gave  to each of his children.

Its listing followed a 1986-87 study of the historic resources of Shelby County.

The barn is on private property with "No trespassing" signage.

References

Octagon barns in the United States
Barns on the National Register of Historic Places in Kentucky
Buildings and structures completed in 1880
National Register of Historic Places in Shelby County, Kentucky
1880 establishments in Kentucky